International Ghetto was a historical tetragonal region in Pest (Budapest) bounded by Pozsonyi út, Szent István park, Újpesti rakpart, Sziget út for diplomatically protected Jews during World War II. It was established by the government of Ferenc Szálasi, Leader of the Hungarian Nation, after his rise to power on 15 October 1944.

See also
 Jewish ghettos in Europe

References

 
Hungary in World War II